Manos Hatzidakis (also spelled Hadjidakis; ; 23 October 1925 – 15 June 1994) was a Greek composer and theorist of Greek music, widely considered to be one of the greatest Greek composers and one of the most globally recognised. His legacy and contribution are widespread among the works of contemporary Greek music, through the second half of the 20th and into the 21st century. He was also one of the main proponents of the "Éntekhno" form of music (along with Mikis Theodorakis).
In 1960, he received an Academy Award for Best Original Song for his song Never on Sunday from the film of the same name.

Biography

Hatzidakis was born on 23 October 1925 in Xanthi, Greece, to lawyer Georgios Hatzidakis, who came from the village of Myrthios, Agios Vasileios in the Rethymno prefecture in Crete; and Aliki Arvanitidou, who came from Adrianoupolis. His musical education began at the age of four and consisted of piano lessons from the Armenian pianist Anna Altunian. At the same time, he learned to play the violin and the accordion.

After the separation of his parents, Hatzidakis moved permanently to Athens in 1932 with his mother. A few years later in 1938, his father died in an aircraft accident. This event, in combination with the beginning of World War II, brought the family into a difficult financial situation. The young Hatzidakis earned his livelihood as a docker at the port, an ice seller at the Fix factory, an employee in Megalokonomou's photography shop and as an assistant nurse at the 401 Military Hospital.

At the same time, he expanded his musical knowledge by studying advanced music theory with Menelaos Pallandios, in the period 1940-1943. At the same time, he studied philosophy at the University of Athens. However, he never completed this course. During this period, he met and connected with other musicians, writers and intellectuals. Among these were Nikos Gatsos, George Seferis, Odysseas Elytis, Angelos Sikelianos and the artist Yannis Tsarouchis. During the last period of the Axis occupation of Greece, he was an active participant in the Greek Resistance through membership of the United Panhellenic Organization of Youth (EPON), the youth branch of the major resistance organisation EAM, where he met Mikis Theodorakis with whom he soon developed a strong friendship.

Although he had made a statement on the exigency of Greece's entrance to the EEC (European Economic Community, later: European Union), he believed that within the European realm, Greece would be culturally assimilated completely.

In the later years of his life, Hatzidakis explained that his work was meant not to entertain but to reveal. Further, he disclaimed part of his work, written for the Greek cinema and theater, as non-representative contract undertaking of his.

Career
His very first work was the tune for the song "Paper Moon" ("Χάρτινο το Φεγγαράκι"), from Tennessee Williams' A Streetcar Named Desire staged by Karolos Koun's Art Theatre of Athens, a collaboration which continued for 15 years. His first piano piece, "For a Little White Seashell" ("Για μια Μικρή Λευκή Αχιβάδα"), came out in 1947 and in 1948 he shook the musical establishment by delivering his legendary lecture on rembetika, the urban folk songs that flourished in Greek cities, mainly Piraeus, after the Asia Minor refugee influx in 1922 and until then had heavy underworld and cannabis use connections and were consequently looked down upon.  Hatzidakis focused on the economy of expression, the deep traditional roots and the genuineness of emotion displayed in rembetika, and exalted the likes of composers like Markos Vamvakaris and Vassilis Tsitsanis. Putting theory to practice, he adapted classic rembetika in his 1951 piano work, Six Popular Pictures (Έξι Λαϊκές Ζωγραφιές), which was later also presented as a folk ballet. In 1949 he co-founded the Greek Dance Theatre Company with the choreographer Rallou Manou.

At this point he began writing immensely popular "pop" songs and movie soundtracks alongside more serious works, such as 1954's The C.N.S. Cycle (O Kyklos tou C.N.S.), a song cycle for piano and voice recalling the German lied in its form, if not in style. In 1955 he wrote the score for Michael Cacoyannis' film Stella, with actress Melina Mercouri, singing the movie's trademark song "Love that became a double-edged knife" ("Αγάπη που 'γινες δίκοπο μαχαίρι"). Hatzidakis always maintained that he wrote his serious pieces for himself and his less serious ones to make a living. 

In 1958, Hatzidakis met Nana Mouskouri, his first "ideal interpreter", a skilled vocalist who shaped the sounds of his music.  It was 1960 that brought him international success, as his song "Never on Sunday" ("Τα παιδιά του Πειραιά"), from Jules Dassin's film Never on Sunday (Ποτέ την Κυριακή), won him an Academy Award and became a worldwide hit.

In 1962, he produced the musical Street of Dreams (Οδός Ονείρων) and completed his score for Aristophanes' Birds (Όρνιθες), another Art Theater production which caused an uproar over Karolos Koun's revolutionary direction. The score was also used later by Maurice Béjart's Ballet of the 20th Century. He also wrote the music for a song which Arthur Altman added English lyrics to and gave to Brenda Lee. The song was "All Alone Am I". In 1964 he released the album 15 Vespers (Δεκαπέντε Εσπερινοί) with the famous song "Mr Antonis ("Ο Κυρ Αντώνης").

In 1965, his LP Gioconda's Smile (Το Χαμόγελο της Τζιοκόντας) was released on Minos-EMI. In 2004, it was re-released, digitally remastered as an audiophile LP and a CD in the EMI Classics collection. In 1966 he travelled to New York City for the premiere of Illya Darling, a Broadway musical based on Never on Sunday, which starred Mercouri. He did not return to Greece until 1972.

Living outside Greece

While in the United States he completed several more major compositions, including Rhythmology (Rythmologia) for solo piano, his compilation, Gioconda's Smile (produced by Quincy Jones), and the song cycle, Magnus Eroticus (Megalos Erotikos), in which he used ancient (Sappho, Euripides), medieval (stanzas from folk songs and George Hortatzis' romance Erophile) and modern (Dionysios Solomos, Constantine Cavafy, Odysseus Elytis, Nikos Gatsos) Greek poems, as well as an excerpt from the Old Testament book "Song of Songs". His LP Reflections with the New York Rock & Roll Ensemble contained several of his most beautiful songs, either in orchestral form or with English lyrics written by the band – a record that preceded fusion trends by several decades.

Later years

Hatzidakis returned to Greece in 1972 and recorded Magnus Eroticus with opera-trained alto Fleury Dantonaki and singer Dimitris Psarianos. Following the junta's overthrow, he became active in public life and assumed a number of positions in the Athens State Orchestra (KOA), the Greek National Opera (ELS/GNO), and the Hellenic Broadcasting Corporation (ERT). In 1985 he launched his own record company "Seirios" (Sirius). In 1988 he helped Foivos Delivorias get started in his singing career. In 1989 he founded and directed the Orchestra of Colours (Orchestra ton Chromaton), a small symphonic orchestra.

Death
He died on 15 June 1994 in Athens at the age of 68, from acute pulmonary edema. In 1999 the City of Athens dedicated Technopolis in his memory. He was buried in Paiania.

Musical scores
 Adoulotoi Sklavoi -  Unsubdued Slaves – US title (1946)
 Kokkinos Vrahos (1949)
 Dyo Kosmi – The Two Worlds (1949)
 Nekri Politeia – Dead City – US title (1951)
 O Grousouzis –  The Grouch – US title (1952)
 Agni Tou Limaniou - Lily of the Harbour – US title (1952)
 Stella - Στέλλα (1955)
 The Counterfeit Coin - Η κάλπικη λίρα (1955)
 O Drakos – The Ogre of Athens – US title (1956)
One Street Organ, One Life (1958)
To Nisi Ton Gennaion - The Braves' Island – US title (1959)
 Never on Sunday (Ποτέ Την Κυριακή) (1960)
 Woe to the Young (1961)
 It Happened in Athens (1962)
 The 300 Spartans (1962)
 America America (1963)
 Topkapi (1964)
 Gioconda's Smile (Το Χαμόγελο Της Τζοκόντας) (1965)
 Illya Darling (1967) – Broadway musical
 Blue (1968)
 Reflections (1969) – Performed by the New York Rock & Roll Ensemble
 The Invincible Six (1970)
 The Pedestrian (1973)
 Sweet Movie (1974)
 Faccia di spia (1975)
 Memed, My Hawk (1984)
 Reflections (2005) – Performed by Raining Pleasure. Special appearance by Meriam performing the song "Kemal"
 Amorgos (2006)
Six popular pictures Op.5 -ballet for piano based on greek popular melodies 
For a little white seashell Op.1- preludes and dances for the piano (1948)

References

External links
Official website
Manos Hatzidakis on IMDb

1925 births
1994 deaths
20th-century classical composers
20th-century pianists
Best Original Song Academy Award-winning songwriters
Greek classical composers
Greek classical musicians
Greek film score composers
Greek pianists
Greek Resistance members
Greek male songwriters
Male film score composers
Greek LGBT musicians
People from Xanthi
Theatre in Greece
Male pianists
20th-century Greek male musicians
Respiratory disease deaths in Greece
Deaths from pulmonary edema
20th-century Greek LGBT people